Vietnam competed at the 2005 Southeast Asian Games in the Philippines under the IOC country code VIE. By sending a delegation of 516 athletes and competing in 33 out of 40 sports and in 352 out of a total of 439 events, it aimed for a top three placing in the medals table. The final result showed that the Vietnamese team has attained its goal by ranking first in the medal tally with 18 gold, 24 silver and 11 bronze medals. The chief of mission to the games was Nguyen Hong Minh.

Medals

Gold
Athletics
Women high-jump: Bui Thi Nhung - 1.89 m - New Southeast Asian Games record.
Women 100 m: Vu Thi Huong
Men 800 m: Le Van Duong
Women 800 m: Do Thi Bong - 2’03’’65 - New Southeast Asian Games record
Men high-jump: Nguyen Duy Bang - 2.14 m
Women 1500 m: Truong Thanh Hang - 4'18’’50 - New Southeast Asian Games record
Men decathlon: Vu Van Huyen
Women Heptathlon: Nguyen Thi Thu Cuc
Karatedo
Women Team Kata
Men Team Kata
Men Individual Kumite -70 kg: Bui Viet Bang
Women Individual Kumite -60 kg: Nguyen Thi Hai Yen
Women Individual Kumite -48 kg: Vu Thi Nguyet Anh
Wushu
Women Taolu - Gunshu: Dam Thanh Xuan
Women Taolu - Quingshu: Nguyen Thi My Duc
Women Taolu - Changquan: Nguyen Thi My Duc
Men Taolu - Changquan: Nguyen Tien Dat
Women Taolu - Taijiquan - Taijijan: Bui Mai Phuong
Women Shanshu -45 kg: Bui Thi Nhu Trang
Men Shanshu -56 kg: Tran Nhat Huy
Cycling
Women - Mountain - Downhill: Phan Thi Thuy Trang
Men 40 km time trial: Mai Cong Hieu
Shooting
Men 50 m Pistol (60 shots): Nguyen Manh Tuong
Women 10 m Air Pistol (40 Shots): Dam Thi Nga
Men 50 m Rifle Prone (60 shots): ?
Fencing:
Women Individual Sabre: Nguyen Thi Le Dung
Women Team Sabre
Chess
Men Individual Rapid chess: GM Nguyen Ngoc Truong Son
Men Team Rapid chess
Men Individual 'Blitz' chess: GM Nguyen Anh Dung
Women Individual 'Blitz' chess: Nguyen Quynh Anh
Men standard chess: GM Nguyen Ngoc Truong Son
Women standard chess: Nguyen Thi Thanh An
Men standard chess team
Women standard chess team
Wrestling
Men -55 kg: Nguyen Van Hop
Men -84 kg: Man Ba Xuan
Women -55 kg: Nghiem Thi Giang
Men -60 kg: Doi Dang Hy
Men -74 kg: Le Duy Hoi
Women -63 kg: Luong Thi Quyen
Taekwondo:
Women -51 kg: Do Thi Bich Hanh
Women -47 kg: Nguyen Thi Huyen Dieu (her 4th gold medal in a row since 1999)
Men -84 kg: Nguyen Trong Cuong
Men +84: Nguyen Van Hung (his 4th Gold medal in a row since 1999)
Gymnastics
Women artistic individual - all round: Do Thi Ngan Thuong
Women balance beam: Do Thi Ngan Thuong
Men Pommel Horse: Truong Minh Sang 
Men's Rings: Nguyen Minh Tuan
Men Parallel Bars: Pham Phuoc Hung
Swimming:
Men 100 m breast stroke: Nguyen Huu Viet
Billiards and Snooker:
Men's English Billiards Single: Nguyen Thanh Long
Men billiards caroom: Nguyen Thanh Binh
Rowing:
Women double sculls: Mai Thi Dung & Dang Thi Tham
Judo:
Women -48 kg: Van Ngoc Tu
Women -63 kg: Nguyen Thi Nhu Y
Men -55 kg: Nguyen Duy Khanh
Men -60 kg: Tran Van Doat
Arnis:
Men Individual: Nguyen Quang Tung
Women Individual: Nguyen Thi My
Men -71 kg: Nguyen Thanh Quyen
Football:
Women team
Pencak silat:
Men -55 kg: Tran Van Toan
Women -65 kg: Nguyen Thi Phuong Thuy
Men -60 kg: Nguyen Ba Trinh
Women -60 kg: Trinh Thi Nga
Women -55 kg: Huynh Thi Thu Hong
Women -50 kg: Le Thi Hang
Men +90 kg: Nguyen Van Hung
Canoeing:
Men 500 m C1: Nguyen Duc Canh
Bodybuilding:
Men -55 kg: Pham Van Mach
Tennis
?

Silver
Athletics
Women high-jump: Nguyen Thi Ngoc Tam - 1.86 m.
Women pole vault: Le Thi Phuong - 4.00 m
Men high-jump: Nguyen Thanh Phong - 2.11 m
Men 3000 m Steeplechase: Tran Van Thang
Women 400 m hurdle: Nguyen Thi Nu
Women 1500 m: Do Thi Bong
Women 4 × 100 m relay
Women 200 m: Vu Thi Huong
Diving
Women’s 10-meter synchronized platform: Hoang Thanh Tra & Nguyen Hoai Anh
Women’s 3-meter springboard individual: Hoang Thanh Tra
Women's 3 meter synchronized springboard
Karatedo
Women Individual kata: Nguyen Hoang Ngan
Men Individual Kumite -65 kg: Nguyen Bao Toan
Men Individual Kumite (open weight): Nguyen Ngoc Thach
Taekwondo:
Men’s -58 kg: Vu Anh Tuan 
Fencing:
Women Individual Épée: Nguyen Thi Nhu Hoa
Men Individual Épée: Do Huu Cuong 
Women Team Foil
Men’s foil team 
Wushu
Women Taolu - Nanquan: Nguyen Thi Ngoc Oanh
Men Taolu - Gunshu: Nguyen Tien Dat
Men Taolu - Qiangshu: Nguyen Van Cuong
Men Taolu - Diaullien/Duel Event: Nguyen Tien Dat & Tran Duc Trong
Women Sanshou -52 kg: Ngo Thi Ha   
Men Sanshou -48 kg: Le Minh Tung   
Men Sanshou -70 kg: Nguyen Duc Trung 
Women Taolu - Daoshu: Dam Thanh Xuan
Women Taolu - Diaullien/Duel Event: Nguyen Thi My Duc & Vu Tra My
Billiards and Snooker
Men 8 Ball Pool Doubles: Nguyen Phuoc Long & Nguyen Thanh Nam
Men 9 Ball Doubles: Nguyen Thanh Nam & Luong Chi Dung
Men billiards caroom: Le Phuoc Loi
Men individual 9-ball billiard: Luong Tri Dung
Gymnastics:
Women Artistic Team
Women Artistic Individual all round: Nguyen Thuy Duong 
Men Parallel Bars: Nguyen Ha Thanh
Sport Aerobics: Mixed doubles: Nguyen Tan Thanh & Nguyen Thi Thanh Hien
Wrestling
Men -66 kg: Phan Duc Thang
Women -48 kg: Nguyen Thi Hang
Women -51 kg: Nguyen Thi Thu
Men -96 kg: Nguyen Van Duc
Rowing:
Women double sculls: Pham Thi Hien & Nguyen Thi Thi
Men single sculls: Phan Thanh Hao
Table tennis:
Men Team
Shooting:
Men 10 m air rifle: Nguyen Tan Nam
Men 25 m standard pistol: Nguyen Manh Tuong
Women Skeet Individual - Shotgun (75 Targets): Nguyen Thi Duc Hanh
Women 50 m Rifle 3-Position: Nguyen Thi Hang
Women double trap: Hoang Thi Tuat
Sepak Takraw:
Women Hoop Team
Women Regu team
Pencak Silat:
Men team performance: Nguyen Huy Bao, Nguyen Dang Linh and Le Quang Dung
Men individual performance: Nguyen Viet Anh
Men -75 kg: Dinh Cong Son
Weightlifting:
Women -63 kg: Nguyen Thi Thiet
Judo:
Women -52 kg: Do Khanh Van
Women -57 kg: Nguyen Thi Kieu
Arnis:
Men team: Nguyen Thanh Tung, Tran Thanh Tung & Tran Duc Nghia
Women team: Nguyen Thu Ha, Vu Thi Thao & Nguyen Thi Loan
Women -52 kg: Nguyen Thi Thanh Huyen
Boxing:
Women -50 kg: Vu Thi Hai Yen
Women -54 kg: Ta Thi Minh Nghia
Men -51 kg: Tran Quoc Viet
Canoeing:
Men 500 m MK2: Tran Huu Tri & Nguyen Khanh Thanh
Bodybuilding:
Men -75 kg: Giap Tri Dung
Football:
Men football team
Petanque:
Women team
Volleyball:
Women team
Chess:
Women individual standard chess: Le Thanh Tu
Men Individual standard chess: Le Quang Liem

Bronze
Karatedo
Men Individual Kata: Le Xuan Hung
Men Team Kumite
Women Team Kumite
Women Individual Kumite +60 kg: Nguyen Thi Nga
Men Individual Kumite -55 kg: Pham Tran Nguyen
Men Individual Kumite -60 kg: Vo Manh Tuan
Men Individual Kumite -75 kg: Mai Xuan Luong
Women Individual Kumite -53 kg: Dao Tu Anh
Women Individual Kumite (open weight): Nguyen Thi Hai Yen
Tennis
Men Team
Women Team
Wushu
Women Taolu - Gunshu: Lam Kieu My Dung
Women Taolu - Nanquan: Nguyen Thi Thuy Duong
Women Taolu - Quingshu: Vu Tra My
Men Taolu - Gunshu: Truong Quoc Chi
Athletics
Women 10,000 m: Truong Thi Mai
Men decathlon: Bui Van Ha
Women 4 × 400 m Relay
Fencing:
Women Individual Épée: Ha Thi Sen
Men’s individual sabre: Nguyen Van Que
Women's Individual foil: Nguyen Thi Tuoi
Men's Individual foil: Bui Van Thai  
Men Team Épée
Women Team Épée
Men Team Sabre
Taekwondo:
Men's -72 kg: Cao Trong Chinh
Women -63 kg: Bui Thu Hien
Women -55 kg: Le Thi Thu Nguyet
Men -58 kg: Dinh Thanh Long
Women -59 kg: Nguyen Thi Hoai Thu
Women -67 kg: Nguyen Thi Ngoc Tram
Women -72 kg: Tran Thi Ngoc Tram
Women +72 kg: Tran Thi Ngoc Bich
Cycling:
Women cross-country: Nguyen Thanh Dam
Women 27 km time trial: Nguyen Thi Hoang Oanh
Men 170 km: Trinh Phat Dat
Shooting
Men trap team
Men 10 m Air Pistol (60 Shots): Hoang Xuan Vinh
Women 25 m Pistol (30+30): Pham Thi Ha
Men 25 m standard pistol: Pham Cao Son
Men 25 m Center Fire Pistol (30+30): Nguyen Manh Tuong
Women 50 m Rifle 3-Position: Nguyen Thi Hoa
Gymnastics:
Men Artistic Team
Women Uneven Bars: Nguyen Thuy Duong
Women Floor exercise: Phan Thi Ha Thanh
Women Balance beam: Phan Thi Ha Thanh
Women Rhythmic - Team Championship
Rowing:
Men double sculls: Hoang Duc Tan & Nguyen Hoang Anh
Badminton
Men Team
Volleyball:
Men Indoor Team
Judo:
Men -100 kg: Ly Huynh Long
Men +100 kg: Dang Hao
Women -45 kg: Dang Le Bich Van
Women -70 kg: Nguyen Thi Dinh
Men -73 kg: Nguyen Tran Minh Nhut
Men -66 kg: Nguyen Quoc Hung
Women +78 kg: Dinh Thi Diem Tuyen
Women -78 kg: Nguyen Thi Anh Ngoc
Weightlifting:
Women -48 kg: Nguyen Thi Bich Ha
Men -85 kg: Luu Van Thang
Men -94 kg: Vu Hong Phong
Women -69 kg: Khuat Minh Hai
Pencak Silat:
Women team performance
Women individual performance
Table tennis:
Men doubles: Tran Tuan Quynh & Nguyen Nam Hai
Men single: Doan Kien Quoc
Chess:
Men 'blitz' individual: Nguyen Ngoc Truong Son
Women 'blitz' individual: Hoang Thi Bao Tram
Canoeing:
Women 500 Meter K1: Doan Thi Cach
Women 500 m WK4: Doan Thi Cach, Bui Thi Phuong, Nguyen Thi Loan & Nguyen Thi Hoa
Women 500 m WK2: Nguyen Thi Ha & Nguyen Thi Loan
Bodybuilding:
Men -70 kg: Cao Quoc Phu
Men -80 kg: Ly Duc
Petanque:
Women individual
Women doubles
Men doubles
Men team
Boxing:
Men -60 kg: Do Duc Thanh
Women -60 kg: Dinh Thi Phuong Thanh
Men ?
Men ?

Results by event

Archery

2005
2005 in Vietnamese sport
Nations at the 2005 Southeast Asian Games
Southeast Asian Games